Internet Security Essentials, also InternetSecurityEssentials, is rogue security software pretending to protect the computer against malware and viruses. It is one of several clones belonging to the "FakeVimes" family of fake antivirus malware.

Similarly named utilities 
The malware is deliberately named so as a subterfuge, because there are several legitimate security utilities with similar names, specifically:
Internet Security Essentials by Comodo Group
Microsoft Security Essentials
Webroot Internet Security Essentials

Operation
As a fake antivirus program affecting Microsoft operating systems (Windows 9x, 2000, XP, Vista, Windows 7 and Windows 8) it installs itself through the use of a trojan horse. Once downloaded and operating, it claims to find various viruses and malware on the computer that pose imminent danger scaring the user through pop-ups to buy its protection (scareware), while in reality the program itself is the malware.

See also
List of rogue security software

References

External links
 Scan results of a FakeVimes malware sample on the website VirusTotal
 Scan results of a FakeVimes malware sample
 Scan results of a FakeVimes malware sample

Rogue software
Scareware